Benjamin Joel Esser, known mononymously as Esser, is an English singer, songwriter and producer. He is from Chelmsford, Essex and was formerly a drummer for the band Ladyfuzz.

His debut album, Braveface, was released in the UK in May 2009 via Transgressive Records; Esser promoted the record as a support act for the Kaiser Chiefs' UK arena tour and also on his own tour, joined by a live band that included his brother. He released an EP, Enmity, in 2012, taking influence from Krautrock groups such as Cluster and Harmonia.

Esser attended Great Baddow High School. Uniformed students from the school appeared in the video of his single Headlock.

Discography
Braveface (2009)
Enmity (2012)

Singles
"I Love You" (2008)
"Satisfied" (2008)
"Work It Out" (2009)
"Headlock" (2009)
"Enmity" (2012)

References

External links

Year of birth uncertain
Living people
21st-century English singers
English electronic musicians
English pop singers
English record producers
English male singer-songwriters
Musicians from Essex
People from Chelmsford
21st-century British male singers
Year of birth missing (living people)